Aethiopicodynerus bimammilatus is a species of wasp in the family Vespidae. It was described by Gusenleitner in 1987.

References

Potter wasps
Insects described in 1987